Seyyed Reżā Zavāreʾi (1938–2005) was an Iranian jurist and politician. He served as a member of the Member of Guardian Council from 1995 to 1996, and 1998 to 2004.

He was acting mayor of Tehran, deputy head of the judiciary in charge of the real estate and documents registration organization from 1989 to 1997. Zavareʾi was also prosecutor of the Islamic Revolution Court in Tehran and a deputy to interior minister after the 1979 revolution.

References 

People from Tehran Province
1938 births
2005 deaths
Deputies of Tehran, Rey, Shemiranat and Eslamshahr
Islamic Coalition Party politicians
Central Council of the Islamic Republican Party members
Members of the 1st Islamic Consultative Assembly
Members of the 2nd Islamic Consultative Assembly
Mayors of Tehran
Iranian prosecutors
Candidates in the 1997 Iranian presidential election
Members of the Guardian Council
People from Varamin